Urbe Bikini (UB) is a Venezuelan, Maxim-styled monthly men's magazine with original photographs of famous models and editorial content geared to men 25 to 40. From its launch in December 2003, Urbe Bikini has become the largest circulation glossy in the country. The magazine was published by the same company that in 1995 had launched Venezuela's first alternative weekly, Urbe.

History
Urbe Bikini was created by Urbe's editor-in-chief and creative director, Gabriel Torrelles, along with country's largest publisher, Cadena Capriles.

Impact and style
The creative visual input and influence of advertising and fashion photographer Jorge Parra, who produced and photographed all editorial content for the first five editions of Urbe Bikini, has helped creating this editorial success, an opened the opportunities to a new breed of young photographers in Venezuela.

More recently, the magazine has gone more towards boudoir-soft porn kind of imagery, which has led to still higher record sales for editorial publications in Venezuela.

References

2003 establishments in Venezuela
Bikinis
Magazines established in 2003
Men's magazines
Monthly magazines
Mass media in Caracas
Spanish-language magazines
Magazines published in Venezuela